Cardiac arrest is when the heart stops beating.

Cardiac Arrest may also refer to:

Cardiac Arrest (film), a 1980 film
Cardiac Arrest (TV series), BBC television drama about the British NHS in the 1990s
Cardiac Arrest, the first name of English band Cardiacs
Cardiac Arrest (album), the 1977 debut album by American band Cameo
"Cardiac Arrest" (Madness song), 1981
"Cardiac Arrest" (Teddybears song), 2011
"Cardiac Arrest", a 2013 single by Bad Suns that was included on the album Language & Perspective
"Cardiac Arrest", a song from the album Ample Destruction by Jag Panzer, 1984